Major-General Peter Frank Aubrey Sibbald  (24 March 1928 – 5 July 1994) was a British Army officer.

Military career
Educated at Haileybury, Sibbald was commissioned into the King's Own Yorkshire Light Infantry in 1948 and saw action during the Malayan Emergency and the Korean War. He became commanding officer of a battalion of The Light Infantry in 1968. He became Commander of 51st Gurkha Infantry Brigade in Hong Kong in 1972, Divisional Brigadier, Light Division in 1975 and General Officer Commanding North West District in 1977. His last appointment was as Director of Infantry in 1980 before retiring in 1983.

He was appointed a Companion of the Order of the Bath in the 1982 New Year Honours.

In 1958 he married Margaret Maureen Entwistle; they had one son and one daughter.

References

 

1928 births
1994 deaths
British Army personnel of the Korean War
British Army personnel of the Malayan Emergency
British Army generals
Companions of the Order of the Bath
King's Own Yorkshire Light Infantry officers
Officers of the Order of the British Empire
People educated at Haileybury and Imperial Service College